Xenon trioxide is an unstable compound of xenon in its +6 oxidation state. It is a very powerful oxidizing agent, and liberates oxygen from water slowly, accelerated by exposure to sunlight. It is dangerously explosive upon contact with organic materials. When it detonates, it releases xenon and oxygen gas.

Chemistry
Xenon trioxide is a strong oxidising agent and can oxidise most substances that are at all oxidisable. However, it is slow-acting and this reduces its usefulness.

Above 25 °C, xenon trioxide is very prone to violent explosion:

2 XeO3 → 2 Xe + 3 O2 (ΔHf = −403 kJ/mol)

When it dissolves in water, an acidic solution of xenic acid is formed:

XeO3(aq) + H2O → H2XeO4  H+ + 

This solution is stable at room temperature and lacks the explosive properties of xenon trioxide. It oxidises carboxylic acids quantitatively to carbon dioxide and water.

Alternatively, it dissolves in alkaline solutions to form xenates. The  anion is the predominant species in xenate solutions. These are not stable and begin to disproportionate into perxenates (+8 oxidation state) and xenon and oxygen gas. Solid perxenates containing  have been isolated by reacting  with an aqueous solution of hydroxides. Xenon trioxide reacts with inorganic fluorides such as KF, RbF, or CsF to form stable solids of the form .

Physical properties
Hydrolysis of xenon hexafluoride or xenon tetrafluoride yields a solution from which colorless XeO3 crystals can be obtained by evaporation. The crystals are stable for days in dry air, but readily absorb water from humid air to form a concentrated solution. The crystal structure is orthorhombic with a = 6.163 Å, b = 8.115 Å, c = 5.234 Å, and 4 molecules per unit cell. The density is 4.55 g/cm3.

Safety
XeO3 should be handled with great caution. Samples have detonated when undisturbed at room temperature. Dry crystals react explosively with cellulose.

References

External links
 Webelements periodic table: page on Xenon(VI) oxide

Oxides
Xenon(VI) compounds
Inorganic compounds